6th Missouri Infantry can refer to:

 6th Missouri Infantry Regiment (Union), Union regiment during the American Civil War
 6th Missouri Infantry Regiment (Confederate), Confederate regiment during the American Civil War